Douglas Nelson Strawbridge (21 October 1908 – 6 December 1979) served as Mayor of Nelson, New Zealand from 1962 to 1968. Strawbridge was born, the son of Charles James Strawbridge and Martha Annie Strawbridge. He attended Nelson College in 1923 and became a building contractor.

Strawbridge was elected Mayor of Nelson in 1962 and held the position to 1968.

He died at Nelson, and was buried at Marsden Valley Cemetery, Stoke.

References 

1908 births
1979 deaths
People educated at Nelson College
Mayors of Nelson, New Zealand
Burials at Marsden Valley Cemetery
20th-century New Zealand politicians